"The Hudson" is a song by Scottish singer-songwriter Amy Macdonald. The song was released as a digital download on 27 August 2020 as the lead single from her fifth studio album The Human Demands. The song was written by Amy Macdonald, Matt Jones and produced by Jim Abbiss. It is her first top 20 hit in Scotland since 2012's "Slow It Down".

Background
In an interview with Wonderland, Macdonald talked about the stories her dad told her about New York in the 70s, "My dad has loads of stories and the stories of him and my mum travelling around the US when they were younger are amazing. He had been telling me about staying in a hotel in New York that had 3 bolts across the door. [...] It explores all the same themes of life and wondering if you’ve made the right decisions and taken the right path but it feels like it means so much more to me because of everything that has happened through these years."

Music video
A music video to accompany the release of "The Hudson" was first released onto YouTube on 17 September 2020. The video was directed by Rubber. Talking about the video, Macdonald said, "The Hudson is such a special song because of the back story, and I felt like it needed a striking video to really highlight the story. It feels cinematic and highlights the feelings of lost love and hindsight, looking back and wondering if life could have panned out differently – it’s something we all do and yet we'll never know the answer. Making this video in the midst of a pandemic was absolutely crazy. Having a team across the Atlantic working away in New York City whilst we sat at home was strange. I didn't know how we'd make it work or how my images would tie in with the images from NYC but I'm so pleased with the final outcome. I’ve always wanted to make a video that feels like a movie and I think I’m finally there. Enjoy!"

Track listing

Personnel
Credits adapted from Tidal.
 Jim Abbiss – producer
 Amy Macdonald – composer, writer
 Matt Jones – composer, writer, guitar, strings
 Harry Koisser – 12 string guitar
 Matt Park – acoustic guitar, mandolin
 Chris Hill – bass, piano, synthesizer
 Brad Webb – drums, percussion
 Alex Di Camillo – engineer
 Dick Beetham – engineer
 Edd Hartwell – engineer
 Giovanni Giagu – engineer
 Ruadhri Cushnan – engineer

Charts

Release history

References

2020 singles
2020 songs
Amy Macdonald songs
Songs written by Amy Macdonald